The  is a bus service operated by the Bus Service Division, the . It is also called .

The bureau mainly operates bus routes in the special wards of Tokyo, as well as those in the city of Ōme in the western Tama Area. It creates a virtual monopoly of bus routes in the central Tokyo (the area roughly within Yamanote Line loop), while those in other parts of Tokyo Metropolis and the Greater Tokyo Area are operated by many different companies. TMBT also operates a few other bus services, such as chartered bus, school bus, and community bus. Tokyo is one of the only two Japanese prefectures that directly operate bus routes, the other being Nagasaki Ken-ei Bus by the Transportation Bureau of Nagasaki Prefecture.

Toei Bus has an official mascot called , a bug-like personification of a bus vehicle.

History
When Tokyo Shiden (Tokyo City Streetcar, the current Tokyo Toden) lines were damaged by the Great Kantō earthquake in 1923, Tokyo City Electricity Bureau started 2 bus routes, originally as an emergency measure. They became the origin of Tokyo City Bus. In 1943, TCEB changed to the Tokyo Metropolitan Bureau of Transportation, as the city changed to the metropolis.

Right after the World War II, there were only 12 routes still in operation. 400 surplus buses from U.S. force were sold to TMBT, helping its recovery. Toei Bus had a good financial condition in 1950s, but went into red from 1961. After 1963, many streetcar lines were closed, and new bus routes started their services as substitutes, making the backbone of the current network. In 1975, the bureau succeeded the routes in Ōme from Seibu Bus.

Toei Bus had the highest ridership in 1972 fiscal year, with the average of 1,298,912 daily passengers. With the growth of subway network, the ridership is continuously decreasing. It had the average of 568,863 daily passengers in 2005 fiscal year.

Bus depots
Toei Bus is operated with 12 bus depots and 7 branch offices. Latin letters are assigned to each depot/branch for vehicle identification and such.
: V; Nakakasai, Edogawa.
: R; Rinkai, Edogawa.
: S; Shinonome, Kōtō.
: N; Kamiya, Kita.
: F; Toyotamakami, Nerima.
: L; Kōtōbashi, Sumida.
: K; Minamisenju, Arakawa.
: Z; Shiratori, Katsushika.
: K; Shiratori, Katsushika.
: E; Higashinakano, Nakano.
: G; Ōtsuka, Bunkyō.
: H; Umeda, Adachi.
: B; Higashi, Shibuya
: B; Nishishinjuku, Shinjuku.
: A; Kitashinagawa, Shinagawa.
: Y; Kōnan, Minato.
: P; Sugamo, Toshima.
: T; Nishiwaseda, Shinjuku.
: W; Morishitachō, Ōme.
: D; Umesato, Suginami.

List of regular routes
Most routes are designated by one or two kanji followed by a two-digit number. Some routes have Latin alphabets instead of kanji. A number may be followed by a celestial stem (kō, otsu, etc., equivalent to abc or 123). The term orikaeshi is equivalent to the European bis. "Readings" provided here are tentative. There are no widely accepted English names of the routes. TMBT uses the kanji names even in English texts, like "有30 starts from Kameari-eki Kitaguchi".

All routes are equipped with accessibility feature, such as non-step buses with kneeling function. 

There are also some non-regular routes, including those for Tokyo Big Sight, the National Theatre of Japan, Edogawa Kyōtei Course, the Tokyo Bay Great Fireworks, and the Sumidagawa Fireworks Festival.

Vehicles
There are 1,467 buses used by TMBT. These are manufactured by Isuzu Motors, Hino Motors, Nissan Diesel, Mitsubishi Fusō and Volgren (imported from Australia). The bureau is keen on introducing vehicles with accessibility feature, such as non-step buses. As of April 2006, there are 854 non-step buses, or 58% of its entire fleet. The bureau also employs relatively many eco-friendly vehicles as Japanese bus operator, including 157 natural gas buses.

Fares
For the routes in the special wards of Tokyo, the adult fares are as follows, regardless of the distance. Riders get on a bus from a front door, and get off from a rear door.

Regular routes: ¥210
Gaku Bus: ¥180
The routes designated with the kanji 学 (gaku). They mainly transport college students.
Shuttle Bus (C-H 01): ¥190
Access Line Bus (AL 01): ¥100
Midnight 25: ¥420
Night bus routes, designated with the kanji 深夜 (shin'ya "midnight").

For the routes in Ōme, the fare varies depending on the distance. Riders get on a bus from a rear door, and get off from a front door.

All the Toei Bus cars accept Common Bus Card, a magnetic fare collection card, as well as PASMO and Suica, contactless smart cards.

See also

List of bus operating companies in Japan
Transportation in Greater Tokyo

References

External links

 Tokyo Metropolitan Bureau of Transportation official website

Bus transport in Tokyo
Tokyo Metropolitan Bureau of Transportation